The Australia Award for Urban Design is a national annual urban design award in Australia. Established in 2001, it is the successor of the Prime Minister's Urban Design Task Force Award that started in 1996.The Award is hosted by the Planning Institute of Australia with support from the Australian Institute of Architects, Engineers Australia, Green Building Council of Australia, Consult Australia, The Australian Urban Design Forum, ASBEC and the Australian Institute of Landscape Architects.

References

Urban design
Australian awards
2001 establishments in Australia
Awards established in 2001